Elisabeth Högström (born 17 March 1951 as Elisabeth Carlsson) is a Swedish curler, world champion and five times European champion.

In 1973 she was inducted into the Swedish Curling Hall of Fame. In 2016 she was inducted into the World Curling Federation Hall of Fame.

International championships
Högström became world champion in 1981 as skip for the Swedish team. She received a silver medal in 1980 and 1982.

She participated on the Swedish team that won the European championship in 1976. She received gold medals in the 1980, 1982, 1983 and 1988 European Curling Championships as skip for the team.

Personal life

References

External links

1951 births
Living people
Swedish female curlers
World curling champions
European curling champions